Curtis Reed (March 24, 1815 – March 18, 1895) was an American businessman and politician in Wisconsin.

Born to parents Seth Reed (1781-1848) and Rhoda (Finney) Reed (1781-1874) in Westford, Massachusetts, Curtis Reed had some education in local schools. At the age of 19 he went "west", moving to Milwaukee, Michigan Territory, in 1834, and then to the town of Summit in Waukesha County, Wisconsin where he farmed. He was one of eight Reed children.  His brothers were Herbert Reed of Milwaukee, Orson Reed of Summit, Harrison Reed and George Reed. His sisters were Mary Augusta Reed Smith (1811-1866), Martha Reed Mitchell (1817-1902) and Julia Ann Reed Noyes.

He moved to Menasha, Wisconsin on the Fox River in 1845. There he helped Charles Doty, a state legislator, with surveying the land. He also helped develop the Fox River area and Doty Island.

Reed entered local politics, and served on the Milwaukee, Waukesha, and Winnebago Counties Board of Supervisors. In 1846, Reed was elected to the Wisconsin Territorial Council. He was elected to terms in the Wisconsin State Assembly in 1853 and 1861.

Reed settled in Menasha in his later years, and was appointed as United States postmaster (1886–1889 and 1893–1895). He served as mayor (1890–1891) on the Menasha Common Council. He helped develop the Menasha-Neenah area, encouraging local businessmen and recruiting new businesses. He died in Menasha, Wisconsin in 1895, and was buried at Oak Hill Cemetery in Neenah.

References

External links

1815 births
1895 deaths
People from Westford, Massachusetts
People from Menasha, Wisconsin
Politicians from Milwaukee
People from Summit, Waukesha County, Wisconsin
Businesspeople from Milwaukee
Wisconsin city council members
Mayors of places in Wisconsin
County supervisors in Wisconsin
Members of the Wisconsin Territorial Legislature
Members of the Wisconsin State Assembly
Wisconsin postmasters
19th-century American politicians
19th-century American businesspeople